The following is a list of San Diego Asian Film Festival winners by year.

2022 - 23rd Annual 
November 3-12, 2022

Award Winners 
 Grand Jury Award - Wisdom Gone Wild (dir. Rea Tajiri)
 Best Narrative Feature - Riceboy Sleeps (dir. Anthony Shimi)
 Best Documentary Feature - Bad Axe (dir. David Siev)
 Best Narrative Short - Last Hawaiian Sugar (dir. Déjà Cresencia Bernhardt)
 Best Documentary Short - In Loving Memory (of Who We Used to Be) (dir. Vicky Lee)
 Best Experimental Short - Declarations of Love (dir. Tiff Rekem)
 International Short  - Will You Look at Me (dir. Shuli Huang)
 Special Jury Mention - Lucky Fish (dir. Emily May Jampel)
 Emerging Filmmaker Award - Liquor Store Dreams (dir. So Yum Um)
 Audience Award Winner - Riceboy Sleeps (dir. Anthony Shim)

Notable Events and Appearances 

 Notable Films: A Confucian Confusion 4K restoration, No Bears

2021 - 22nd Annual 
October 28 to November 6, 2021

Award Winners 
Grand Jury Award - I Was A Simple Man  (dir. Christopher Makoto Yogi)
 Best Narrative Feature - 7 Days (dir. Roshan Sethi)
 Best Documentary Feature - Manzanar Diverted: When Water Becomes Dust (dir. Ann Kaneko)
 Best Narrative Short - Americanized (dir. Erica Eng)
 Best Documentary Short - An Uninterrupted View of the Sea (dir. Mika Yatsuhashi)
Best Experimental Short - Rumi and his Roses (dir. Navid Sinaki)
 International Short  - Lemongrass Girl (dir. Pom Bunsermvicha)
 Special Jury Mention - To Live Here (dir. Melanie Dang Ho)
Emerging Filmmaker Award - Never Rest/Unrest (dir. Tiffany Sia)
 Audience Award Winner - Like a Rolling Stone: The Life and Times of Ben Fong-Torres (dir. Suzanne Joe Kai)

Notable Events and Appearances 

 Notable Films: Catch the Fair One, Drive My Car
 Special Sections: Asian-American Panorama, Asia Pop!, Masters, Classics Restored, Taiwan Film Showcase

2020 - 21st Annual 
October 23–31, 2020

Award Winners 

Grand Jury Award - Mizuko (Water Child) (dir. Katelyn Rebelo, Kira Dane)
 Best Narrative Feature - Mogul Mowgli (Bassam Tariq)
 Best Documentary Feature - The Donut King (Alice Gu)
 Best Narrative Short - Thank You, Come Again (Nirav Bhakta)
 Best Documentary Short - I Bought a Time Machine (Yeon Park)
 Best Animated Short - Felt Love (Angeline Vu and Arlene Bongco)
 International Short  - Red Aninsri; or, Tiptoeing on the Still Trembling Berlin Wall (Ratchapoom Boonbunchachoke)
 Special Jury Mention - Finding Yingying (Jiayan “Jenny” Shi)
George C. Lin Emerging Filmmaker Award - Stray (Elizabeth Lo)
 Audience Award Winner - Down a Dark Stairwell (Ursula Lang)

Notable Events and Appearances 

Notable Films: 76 Days, Mogul Mowgli
 Special Events (Pandemic Specials): Virtual Cinema options, Drive-In Movies, Q&As on Twitch, 16mm x Twitch, Mystery Kung Fu Theater, Taiwan Showcase, Virtual Lobby on Animal Crossing

2019 - 20th Annual 
November 7–16, 2019

Award Winners 

 Grand Jury Award - Straight Up (James Sweeney)
 Best Narrative Feature - Driveways (Andrew Ahn)
 Best Documentary Feature - The Cancer Journals, Revisited (Lana Lin)
 Best Narrative Short - First (Micaela Durand & Daniel Chew)
 Best Documentary Short - My American Surrogate (Leslie Tai)
 Best Animated Short - Umbilical (Danski Tang)
 International Short  - Grand Bouquet (Nao Yoshigai)
 Special Jury Mention - Jaddoland  (Nadia Shihab)
 George C. Lin Emerging Filmmaker Award - No Data Plan (Miko Revereza)
 Audience Award Winner - Yellow Rose (Diane Paragas)

Notable Events and Appearances 

 Opening Night Film: The Paradise We Are Looking For 
 Centerpiece: Straight Up 
 Closing Night: To Live to Sing

Special Events: Taiwan Film Showcase, Spotlight on Tibet

9th Spring Showcase 
April 11–18, 2019

 Opening Night Film: First Night Nerves
 Closing Night Film: Ek Ladki Ko Dekha Toh Aisa Laga
 Notable Films: Memories of My Body, Swing Kids, Song Lang, The Crossing
 Special Events: From the Claws of Darkness: Restoring Philippine Cinema, Mystery Kung Fu Theater

2018 - 19th Annual 
November 8–17, 2018

Award Winners 

 Grand Jury Award: June
 Best Narrative Feature: Bitter Melon
 Best Documentary Feature: Blowin' Up
 Best Narrative Short: First Generation
 Best Documentary Short: Nai Nai
 Best International Short: Babylon
 Best Animated Short: Yoko
 Special Jury Mention: Origin Story
 George C. Lin Emerging Filmmaker Award: August at Akiko's (dir. Christopher Makoto Yogi)
 Lifetime Achievement Award: Marcus Hu
 Audience Award: One Cut of the Dead

Notable Events and Appearances 

 Notable Films: Little Forest, Inventing Tomorrow, Ramen Shop
HBO Preview: Folklore

8th Spring Showcase 
April 19–26, 2018

 Opening Night Film: Meditation Park 
 Closing Night Film: Kusama: Infinity 
 Notable Films: Minding the Gap, Love Education, Mukshin, The Third Murder, 
 Special Presentations: Falling for Angels: the Films of Yasmin Ahmad

2017 - 18th Annual 
November 9–18, 2017

Award Winners 

 Grand Jury Award: My Enemy My Brother, directed by Ann Shin
 Narrative Feature: Wexford Plaza, directed by Joyce Wong
 Documentary Feature: Out of State, directed by Ciara Lacy
 Narrative Short: Float, directed by Tristan Seniuk & Voleak Sip
 Documentary Short: Mother’s Day, directed by Elizabeth Lo & R.J. Lozada
 Animated Short: Crushed in Spaces, directed by Janice Chun
 International Short: Afternoon Clouds, directed by Payal Kapadia
 Special Jury Mention: Santa Claus, directed by Jeff Man
 Digital Pioneer Award: Angry Asian Man, directed by Phil Yu
 George C. Lin Emerging Filmmaker Award: Anahita Ghazvinizadeh, director of They
 Audience Award: Island Soldier, directed by Nathan Fitch

Notable Events and Appearances 

 Notable Films: Oh Lucy!, A Better Man, The Villainess, Columbus and Newton.
 Musical performance by actress/singer Tia Carrere.
 Potluck Collective Podcasts: Saturday School, the Fresh Creatives and They Call Us Bruce.
 Classic Films Restored: Shopping for Fangs (1997), Pigsy Eats Watermelon (1958) and The Little Sisters of the Grassland (1965).
 Mystery Kung Fu Theater

7th Spring Showcase 
April 20–27, 2017

 Notable Films: Gook, An Insignificant Man, The Long Excuse, Sunday Beauty Queen, Window Horses 
 Special Presentations:  “Right to Resist: From 9066 to 2017” featuring four documentary films and four shorts about political resistance.
 Audience Award: Abacus: Small Enough to Jail

2016 - 17th Annual 
November 3–12, 2016

Award Winners 

 Grand Jury Award: The Lockpicker, directed by Randall Okita
 Narrative Feature: Chee and T, directed by Tanuj Chopra
 Documentary Feature: Bad Rap, directed by Salima Koroma
 Narrative Short: Death in a Day, directed by Lin Wang
 Documentary Short: Bruce Takes Dragon Town, directed by Emily Chao
 Animated Short: Hold Me (Ca Caw Ca Caw), directed by Renee Zhan
 Special Jury Mention: Random Acts of Legacy, directed by Ali Kazimi
 George C. Lin Emerging Filmmaker Award: Andrew Ahn, director of Spa Night
 Lifetime Achievement Award: Wayne Wang
 Audience Award: Daze of Justice, directed by Michael Siv

Notable Events and Appearances 

 Notable Films: The Tiger Hunter, Mifune: The Last Samurai
 Standup comedy by Actor and Comedian Randall Park (Fresh Off the Boat, Trainwreck, The Interview).
 Panel discussion with The Edge of Seventeen actor Hayden Szeto.

6th Spring Showcase 
April 28th - May 5th, 2016

 Notable Films: Sweet 20, 3688, Born to Dance, Heart Attack, Honor Thy Father, Right Now, Wrong Then 
 Special Presentations:  “China Now: Independent Visions” featuring four film programs from works from the Beijing Independent Film Festival.
 Audience Award: The Music of Strangers: Yo-Yo Ma and the Silk Road Ensemble (Morgan Neville)

2015 - 16th Annual  
November 5–14, 2015

Award Winners 

 Grand Jury Award: Distance Between, directed by R.J. Lozada
 Narrative Feature: Crush the Skull, directed by Viet Nguyen
 Documentary Feature: Operation Popcorn, directed by David Grabias
 Narrative Short: Drama, directed by Tian Guan
 Documentary Short: From Tonga, directed by Huay-Bing Law
 Animated Short: Cuz He’s Black, directed by Ji Sub Jeong
 Special Jury Mention: Reunification, directed by Alvin Tsang
 George C. Lin Emerging Filmmaker Award: Takeshi Fukunaga, director of Out of My Hand
 Lifetime Achievement Award: Tyrus Wong
 Audience Award: Tyrus, directed by Pamela Tom
 Digital Pioneer Award: BuzzFeed Motion Pictures

Notable Events and Appearances 

 Notable Films: Miss India America, Seoul Searching, Made in Japan.
 Panel discussion with Ken Jeong.
 Discussion with BuzzFeed producer Eugene Lee Yang.

5th Spring Showcase 
April 16th-25th, 2015

 Films: Top Spin, Giovanni’s Island, Margarita, With a Straw, Mariquina, My Brilliant Life, The Taking of Tiger Mountain 3D (Tsui Hark), Today 
 Special Presentation: Cinema Little Saigon, a retrospective of films and videos by Vietnamese Americans on the occasion of the 40th anniversary of the Fall of Saigon
 Audience Award: Princess Jellyfish

2014  - 15th Anniversary 
Nov 6-14, 2014

Award Winners 

 Grand Jury Award: Appropriate Behavior, directed by Desiree Akhavan
 Narrative Feature: Man from Reno, directed by Dave Boyle
 Documentary Feature: My Life in China, directed by Kenneth Eng
 Narrative Short: Hypebeasts, directed by Jessica dela Merced
 Documentary Short: Transformers: the Premake, directed by Kevin B. Lee
 Animated Short: Behind My Behind, directed by David Chai
 Special Jury Mention: Kumu Hina, directed by Dean Hamer and Joe Wilson
 George C. Lin Emerging Filmmaker Award: Vera Brunner-Sung, director of Bella Vista
 Audience Award: Limited Partnership, directed by Thomas Miller
 Digital Pioneer Award: Anna Akana

Notable Events and Appearances 

 Notable Films: Revenge of the Green Dragons, The Kingdom of Dreams and Madness and Meet the Patels.
 Pilot episode of Fresh Off the Boat screening. 
 Taiwan Films Showcase
 Remembering Queer Korea Reception

4th Spring Showcase 
April 17–24, 2014

 Notable Films: Like Father, Like Son, How to Fight in Six Inch Heels, Miss Granny, The Protector 2, Siddharth, Why Don’t You Play in Hell?
 Special Presentation: Live performances of 18 Mighty Mountain Warriors
 Audience Award Winner: To Be Takei

2013 - 14th Annual 
November 7–16, 2013

Award Winners 

 Grand Jury Award: Karaoke Girl, directed by Visra Vichit-Vadakan
 Narrative Feature: Sake-Bomb, directed by Junya Sakino
 Documentary Feature: Your Day is My Night, directed by Lynne Sachs
 Narrative Short: The Perils of Growing Up Flat-Chested, directed by Yulin Kuang
 Documentary Short: Draft Day, directed by Josh Kim
 Animated Short: The Present, directed by Joe Hsieh
 Special Jury Mention: Documented, directed by Jose Antonio Vargas and Ann Lupo
 Social Justice Award: When I Walk, directed by Jason DaSilva
 George C. Lin Emerging Filmmaker Award: Leslie Tai
 Audience Award: American Revolutionary: The Evolution of Grace Lee Boggs, directed by Grace Lee

Notable Events and Appearances 

 Notable Films: Finding Mr. Right, Blind Detective, Norte: The End of History and Ip Man: The Final Fight. 
 Drive-By Cinema screenings of webseries premieres: Night Girls Crew and Flat3.
 Mapping event for wheelchair accessibility with Jason DaSilva.

3rd Spring Showcase 
April 18–25, 2013

 Opening Night Film: Linsanity 
 Closing Night Film: Jab Tak Hai Jaan
 Notable Films: Abigail Harm, Comrade Kim Goes Flying, Kai Po Che, Key of Life, La Source, The Last Supper, Pieta, United Red Army 
 Audience Award: Harana

2012 - 13th Annual 
November 1–9, 2012

Award Winners 

 Grand Jury Award: Johnny Loves Dolores, directed by Clarissa de los Reyes
 Narrative Feature: Graceland, directed by Ron Morales
 Documentary Feature: Seeking Asian Female, directed by Debbie Lum
 Narrative Short: Monday Monday, directed by Eric K. Yue
 Animated Short: 38-39°C, directed by Kangmin Kim
 Special Jury Mention: The World Before Her, directed by Nisha Pahuja
 George C. Lin Emerging Filmmaker Award: Ernie Park, director of Late Summer
 Lifetime Achievement Award: Chung Chang-wha

Notable Events and Appearances 

 Notable Films: Don't Stop Believin': Everyman's Journey

2nd Spring Showcase 
April 19–26, 2012

 Opening Night Film: Sunny 
 Closing Night Film: Zindagi Na Milegi Dobara 
 Notable Films: The Front Line, Headshot, I Wish, Life Without Principle, My Back Page, Patang (Prashant Bhargava), A Simple Life.

2011 - 12th Annual

Award Winners 

 Grand Jury Award: Surrogate Valentine, directed by Dave Boyle
 Narrative Feature: In the Family, directed by Patrick Wang
 Documentary Feature: Tales of the Waria, directed by Kathy Huang
 Narrative Short: Andy, directed by Andrew Ahn
 Documentary Short: Making Noise in Silence, directed by Mina T. Son
 Animated Short: Enrique Wrecks the World, directed by David Chai
 Special Jury Mention: The LuLu Session, directed by S. Casper Wong
 George C. Lin Emerging Filmmaker Award: Patrick Wang, director of In the Family
 Lifetime Achievement Award: Nancy Kwan
 Audience Award: The Power of Two, directed by Marc Smolowitz

Notable Events and Appearances 

 Honored Gala Guests: the Board of San Diego County Supervisors, the director of the San Diego Chinese Historical Museum and the Principal of Barnard Mandarin Chinese Magnet School.

1st Spring Showcase 
April 15–22, 2011

 Opening Night Film: Little Big Soldier (Ding Sheng)
 Closing Night Film: Boy (Taika Waititi)
 Films: Getting Home, Hansel & Gretel, The House of Suh, The Man from Nowhere, One Voice, Patisserie Coin De Rue, Poetry (Lee Chang-dong), Saigon Electric 
 Special Presentation: Japan earthquake fundraiser screening of A Tale of Mari & Three Puppies.

2010 - 11th Annual

Award Winners 

 Grand Jury Award: The House of Suh, directed by Iris Shim
 Narrative Feature: Littlerock, directed by Mike Ott
 Documentary Feature: Finding Face, directed by Skye Fitzgerald and Patti Duncan
 Narrative Short: Works of Art, directed by Andrew Pang
 Documentary Short: Top Spin, directed by Sara Newens and Mina T. Son
 Animated Short: The Wonder Hospital, directed by Beomsik Shimbe Shim
 George C. Lin Emerging Filmmaker Award: Nadine Truong
 Influential Asian American Artist Award: Daniel Dae Kim
 Audience Award: One Voice, directed by Lisette Flannery

Notable Events and Appearances 

 Asian Americans in Hollywood (Panel) - featuring: Ellen Wong, Harry Shum, Aaron Yoo, Jon M. Chu, and CS Lee.

2009 - 10th Anniversary

Award Winners 

 Grand Jury Award: Children of Invention, directed by Tze Chun
 Narrative Feature: Children of Invention, directed by Tze Chun
 Documentary Feature: Whatever It Takes, directed by Christopher Wong
 Narrative Short: A Green Mountain In a Drawer, directed by Hwa-Jun Lee
 Documentary Short: Rough Cut, directed by Firouzeh Khosrovani
 Animated Short: Kudan, directed by Taku Kimura
 Special Jury Mention: A Song For Ourselves, directed by Tadashi Nakamura
 George C. Lin Emerging Filmmaker Award: Mark Tran, director of All About Dad
 Audience Award: White on Rice, directed by David Boyle

Notable Events and Appearances 

 Notable Screenings: Red Cliff, Afro Samurai Resurrection (TV), Detroit Metal City, Neko Ramen and Vampire Girl Vs. Frankenstein Girl.
 Celebrity Appearances: Margaret Cho, Tamlyn Tomita, and Dante Basco.

2008 - 9th Annual

Award Winners 

 Grand Jury Award: Dirty Hands: the Art & Crimes of David Choe, directed by Harry Kim
 Narrative Feature: Santa Mesa, directed by Ron Morales
 Documentary Feature: Shame, directed by Mohammed Naqvi
 Narrative Short: Lady, directed by Wendy Cheng
 Animated Short: Meat Days, directed by Joe Hsieh
 Special Jury Mention: Damn the Past!, directed by Julie Kang
 Lifetime Achievement Award: Soon-Tek Oh

Notable Events and Appearances 

 A Celebrity Panel: Asian Americans in Hollywood - featuring: Aaron Yoo, James Kyson Lee, Leonardo Nam, Smith Cho, Sheetal Sheth, and Jimmy Tsai.
 From Comics to Film - featuring: Greg Pak and Jim Lee

2007 - 8th Annual

Award Winners 

 Grand Jury Award: Cats of Mirikitani, directed by Linda Hattendorf
 Narrative Feature: Owl and the Sparrow, directed by Stephane Gauger
 Documentary Feature: Na Kamalei: The Men of Hula, directed by Lisette Flanary
 Narrative Short: Monsoon, directed by Shyam Balse
 Documentary Short: Mookey’s Story, directed by Carolyn Goossen & Daffodil Altan
 Animated Short: City Paradise, directed by Gaelle Denis
 Music video: Champion by Native Guns, directed by Patricio Ginelsa
 Lifetime Achievement Award: George Takei

2006 - 7th Annual

Award Winners 

 Grand Jury Award: Journey From the Fall, directed by Ham Tran
 Narrative Feature: Eve & the Firehorse, directed by Julia Kwan
 Documentary Feature: Last Atomic Bomb, directed by Robert Richter
 Narrative Short: Hiro, directed by Matthew Swanson
 Animated Short: Mirage, directed by Youngwoon Jang
 Experimental: Latent Sorrow, directed by Shon Kim
 Music Video: Steal the Blueprints, directed by Chris Deaner
 Special Jury Mention: Colma: The Musical, directed by Richard Wong
 Lifetime Achievement Award: Kieu Chin

2005 - 6th Annual

Award Winners 

 Grand Jury Award: Seibutsu: (Still Life), directed by Joe Turner Lin
 Narrative Feature: The Motel, directed by Michael Kang
 Documentary Feature: And Thereafter, directed by Hosup Lee
 Narrative Short: Summer of the Serpent, directed by Kimi Takesue
 Documentary Short: Daastar: Defending Sikh Identity, directed by Kevin Lee
 Animated Short: Public Bath, directed by Tak Hoon Kim
 Experimental: 5 x 90: The Wake, directed by Samuel Kiehoon Lee
 Music Video: Psychokinetics: The Vault, directed by Gene Celso
 Visionary Award: Saving Face, directed by Alice Wu
 Lifetime Achievement: Joan Chen

2004 - 5th Anniversary

Award Winners 

 Grand Jury Award: The Magical Life of Long Tack Sam, directed by Ann Marie Fleming
 Narrative Feature: First Morning, directed by Victor Vu
 Documentary Feature: The Magical Life of Long Tack Sam, directed by Ann Marie Fleming
 Narrative Short: Sangam, directed by Prashant Bhargava
 Documentary Short: Yellow Brotherhood, directed by Tadashi Nakamura
 Animated Short: Birthday Boy, directed by Sejong Park
 Experimental: Balikbayan, directed by Larilyn Sanchez & Riza Manalo
 Music Video: Skyflakes: Bad Thoughts, directed by Dino Ignacio

2003 - 4th Annual

Award Winners 

 Grand Jury Award: Refugee, directed by Spencer Nakasako
 Narrative Feature: Book of Rules, directed by Sung H. Kim
 Documentary Feature: Sleeping Tigers: The Asahi Baseball Story, directed by Jari Osborne
 Narrative Short: Anniversary, directed by Ham Tran
 Documentary Short: How to Make Kimchee, directed by Samuel Kiehoon Lee
 Animated Short: Henry’s Garden, directed by Moon Seun
 Experimental: Nothing But Love, directed by Wen-Yao Chuang

2002 - 3rd Annual

Award Winners 

 Grand Jury Award: Sophie, directed by Helen Lee
 Narrative Feature: Charlotte Sometimes, directed by Eric Byler
 Documentary Feature: Journey for Lotus, directed by Eunhee Cha
 Narrative Short: Barrier Device, directed by Grace Lee
 Documentary Short: BLT Genesis, directed by Evan Leong
 Animated Short: Vessel Wrestling, directed by Lisa Yu
 Experimental: Still I Rise, directed by Umesh Shukla

2001 - 2nd Annual

Award Winners 

 Grand Jury Award: Roads and Bridges, directed by Abraham Lim
 Narrative Feature: Dog Food (Azucena), directed by Carlos Siguion-Reyna
 Documentary Feature: Made in China, directed by Karin Lee
 Narrative Short: Talk to Taka, directed by Richard Kim
 Documentary Short: Bitter and Sweet, directed by Johanna Lee
 Animated Short: Lint People, directed by Helder Sun
 Experimental: Staccato Fugue, directed by Teo Carlo Pulgar

2000 - Festival Launch

Award Winners 

 Grand Jury Award: Karma Local, directed by Darshan Bhagat
 Narrative Feature: The Debut, directed by Gene Cajayon
 Documentary Feature: When You’re Smiling, directed by Janice Tanaka
 Narrative Short: Mouse, directed by Greg Pak
 Documentary Short: Shit, the Movie, directed by Julie Gaw
 Experimental: By this Parting, directed by Mieko Ouchi

References 

Film festivals in San Diego
Asian-American film festivals
Asian-American culture in San Diego
Asian film awards
Asian cinema
Film